"The Sky's the Limit" is the fifth and final single released by Jason Derulo from his self-titled debut album. The single was originally planned for release on December 20, 2010 only in the UK, but was pushed forward to November 15, 2010. The track was added to Radio 1's B-Playlist. This is the only single from the album that wasn't released in the United States. The song includes extensive samples from the 1983 hit "Flashdance... What a Feeling" by Irene Cara.

Music video
The music video was filmed in late September 2010. It features Derulo in a glass room, dancing along with a woman (Shay Maria). Derulo is wearing several types of coats, gloves and glasses, while the woman is wearing a black dress. Right at the end, Derulo smiles at the camera while the start of "In My Head" plays.

Track listing
CD
"The Sky's the Limit" – 3:45

Digital download
"The Sky's the Limit" – 3:45
"The Sky's the Limit" (Wideboys Radio Remix) - 3:37
"The Sky's the Limit" (Wideboys Club Mix) - 7:00
"The Sky's the Limit" (Kim Fai Remix) - 6:28
"The Sky's the Limit" (Ayo Remix) - 3:25

Chart performance
The song debuted in the UK Singles Chart at number 107 and peaked at 68.

In Australia, the song debuted at #97 in October 2010, before climbing to #24, then to #22.

Charts

References

Jason Derulo songs
Song recordings produced by J. R. Rotem
Songs written by J. R. Rotem
Songs written by Alex James (songwriter)
2009 songs
2010 singles
Warner Records singles
Songs written by Jason Derulo